SRT may refer to:

Automotive
 SRT, (Speed & Racing Technology) American high-performance automobile group associated with Dodge, Chrysler and Jeep.
 Suter Racing Technology, a Swiss Moto2 constructor
 Selleslagh Racing Team, Belgium
 Swiss Racing Team, an auto racing team in Switzerland
 Class SRT, a type of London Transport bus.

Science and technology
 .srt, extension for SubRip subtitle computer files
 SRT Communications, Minot, North Dakota, US
 Sweeney-Robertson-Tocher division, computer division algorithm
 Sardinia Radio Telescope
 Secure Reliable Transport, video streaming protocol
 Smart Response Technology, a caching mechanism by Intel
 Sound Recording Technology, UK studio
 Standard Radio & Telefon AB, a Swedish computer manufacturer
Stereotactic radiation therapy
 Superficial radiation therapy
 Shortest remaining time, a scheduling algorithm
 Special relativity theory

Transportation
 Sam Rayburn Tollway, Dallas-Fort Worth area, US
 Scarborough RT, Toronto, Canada rapid transport line
 Shortlands railway station, London, National Rail station code
 State Railway of Thailand
 Super Rapid Train, South Korea

Other uses
 Samuel Robertson Technical Secondary School
Srpska Radiotelevizija or Serbian Radio-television, now Radio Televizija Republike Srpske
 Schuylkill River Trail, Philadelphia, US
 Scottish Register of Tartans
 Serial reaction time, a measure of learning time
 Short Reset Trigger on new SIG Sauer pistols (SIG P226 LDC)
 Sichuan Radio and Television
 Silver Ring Thing, a US-based sexual abstinence program
 Singapore Repertory Theatre
 Single rope technique in caving
 Sitting-rising test, a simple clinical test to predict elderly mortality
 Special reaction team of the US military
 Special Rescue Team,  Japan Coast Guard
 Special Response Team of many US government agencies, see list of special police units
 Minolta SR-T camera series
 Sachin Ramesh Tendulkar, former Indian cricketer